Houaphanh province (Laotian: ຫົວພັນ ; Romanization of Lao: Houaphan) is a province in eastern Laos. Its capital is Xam Neua.

The province is bordered by Vietnam to the north, east, and southeast, Xiangkhouang province to the south and southwest, and Luang Prabang province to the west. The terrain is rugged, with dense, forested mountains forming much of the province, particularly on the western side. The main road running through the province is Route 6. The principal rivers are the Nam Ma, which flows from and into Vietnam, passing the village of Ban Muang-Et, and the Nam Sam, on which the towns of Sam Neua and Sam Tai lie.

The province is the home to the Viengxay caves, an extensive network of caves used by the Pathet Lao, and the Hintang Archaeological Park, one of the most important pre-historic sites in northern Laos, dotted with standing megaliths.

Houaphanh is one of the poorest areas of Laos, but has dramatic scenery and fine textile traditions.

History
The province, along with Xiangkhoang, was part of the Muang Phuan Kingdom (Vietnamese: Bồn Man) since the 14th century. Following a Vietnamese invasion in 1478 led by King Lê Thánh Tông, it became Trấn Ninh Territory of the Đại Việt Kingdom with the capital at Sầm Châu (present-day Xam Neua). The area was known as Hua Phan Tang Ha Tang Hok, 'the fifth and the sixth province", and listed by Auguste Pavie as "Hua Panh, Tang-Ha, Tang-Hoc." The provincial capital was at present-day Muong Het.

The Lê Duy Mật rebels ruled the area from 1739 to 1770. In 1802, Emperor Gia Long of the newly founded Nguyễn dynasty ceded the region to the Kingdom of Vientiane. However, in the aftermath of the Lao rebellion, Chao Nôy, the prince ruler of Muang Phuan, who earlier sided with the Siamese, was executed by the Vietnamese. Emperor Minh Mạng of Vietnam reannexed the territory in 1828.

It remained a Vietnamese outpost territory until 1893 when ownership was switched by French authorities back to Laos during the French colonial period. Under the French spelling, the province was usually Hua Phan.

The province is home to the Viengxay caves, an extensive network of caves used by the Pathet Lao. Numerous caves in the province served as hideouts for important figures in the Laos in the 1950s and 1960s. Tham Than Souphanouvong Cave was the hideout of the revolutionary leader and later the President, Souphanouvong, who built a base there in 1964. Revolutionary leader and later the President Kaysone Phomvihane hid out in Tham Than Kaysone Cave from 1964, and later President Khamtay Siphandone hid at Tham Than Khamtay Cave from 1964. He established a base there, with meeting rooms, reception rooms, and a research room.

Houaphanh province was noted for its samana ('re-education') camps. The Lao royal family were believed to have been taken to one such camp near Sop Hao in 1977. Crown Prince Say Vong Savang allegedly died at the camp in May 1978, followed by his father, King Savang Vatthana, of starvation 11 days later.

Religious minorities often face persecution in the province, and at the end of 1999 numerous minorities were arrested.

Geography
The province is bordered by Vietnam to the north, east and southeast, Xiangkhouang province to the south and southwest, and Luang Prabang province to the west.

The terrain is rugged, with dense mountainous forest forming much of the province, particularly on the western side. Notable settlements include Xam Neua, Muong U, Houamuang, Chomsan, Muang Pan, Muang Hom, Muang Peu, Muang Xon, Ban Muang-Et, Ban Nampang, Muong Vene, Xamtai, Muang Na, and Poungthak.

The main road running through the province is Route 6. The principal rivers are the Sông Mã (which flows from and into Vietnam, passing the village of Ban Muang-Et) and the Nam Sam (which the town of Xam Neua lies on).

Protected areas

Areas of Houaphanh province are in the Nam Et-Phou Louey National Biodiversity Conservation Area (NBCA) and the Nam Xam National Biodiversity Conservation Area. There are also some Important Bird Areas (IBA).

The Nam Neun IBA area of Nam Et is adjacent to the NBCA. The habitat is characterized as mixed deciduous forest, as well as dry evergreen forest, with stands of bamboo, and occasional conifers; cleared areas have been replaced by areas of secondary grassland. Key avifauna include great hornbill (Buceros bicornis) and Blyth's kingfisher (Alcedo hercules).

The Phou Louey Massif IBA is in the Nam Et-Phou Louey NBCA and adjacent to the Nam Neun IBA. The Phou Louey IBA stretches beyond Houaphanh province into Luang Prabang province. The habitat is characterized as mixed deciduous forest, semi-evergreen forest, lower montane evergreen forest, upper montane evergreen forest, and secondary grassland. Key avifauna include beautiful nuthatch (Sitta formosa), rufous-necked hornbill (Aceros nipalensis), Blyth's kingfisher (Alcedo hercules), and yellow-vented warbler (Phylloscopus cantator). There are four confirmed species of turtles and two confirmed species of ungulate.

The 69,000 hectare Nam Xam IBA is in the 70,000 ha Nam Xam National Biodiversity Conservation Area (NBCA). The topography is characterized by hills and low mountains. The habitat includes dry evergreen forest, Fokienia forest, mixed deciduous forest, as well as stunted, mossy upper montane forest. Notable avifauna includes beautiful nuthatch (Sitta formosa), brown hornbill (Anorrhinus tickelli), great hornbill (Buceros bicornis), red-collared woodpecker (Picus rabieri), and rufous-necked hornbill (Aceros nipalensis).

Administrative divisions
The province is made up of the following districts:

Economy
Houaphanh province is one of the poorest areas of Laos. In 1998, three quarters of the population were classified as poor. In 2002 GDP per capita was US$50–204, compared to the national average of US$350. Socio-economic problems plague the province, with an infant mortality rate and access to safe water and medical facilities far worse than the national average.

Bamboo is important in rural parts of the province and used as a principal building material. Women play a key role in the collecting of bamboo shoots. In Viengxay District there are two bamboo processing factories that produce items such as floormats, fences, chopsticks and toothpicks for the Vietnamese market. Overall though, the bamboo industry is undeveloped, and many find it difficult to find profitable markets for their goods.

Xam Neua, the provincial centre, is the most important market centre for regional trade. Many villagers come here to sell their goods, especially handicrafts and textiles that the people of the province are famed for. Saleu and Nasala villages in Xiengkho District along Route 6 are noted for their skills at weaving and handicrafts. Samtay is noted for its textiles.

Rice farming is widely practiced in the province, although agriculture employs fewer than livestock farming. Principal cash crops include corn, sesame, soybean, and medicinal plants such as man on ling, duk duea, and kalamong, paper mulberry, styrax, cardamon and cinnamon. Up to 15 percent are involved in opium cultivation and up to 10 percent involved in making handicrafts. Attempts to control poppy cultivation have been made through the Narcotics Crop Control Project and the Houaphanh Project Agreement.

A tourism development plan has been created for the province, capitalizing on the caves as tourist attractions, providing information and services at the sites.

Asian Development Bank launched a project in 2006 specifically covering 31 villages of Xam Neua and Samtay Districts to wean people away from shifting cultivation practices and to eliminate opium addiction; as of 2006, opium was grown in the province in an area of about 30 ha. The project includes programs to increase income, conserve forest resources, eradicate opium, and experiment with pilot projects to enhance livelihood sources.

Demography
The population of the province, as of 2015, was 289,393. The capital is Xam Neua. Minority groups such as the Khmu, Hmong and Phong inhabit this province.

Landmarks
Viengxay is known as a "Hidden Cave City," the heart of the Pathet Lao Liberation Movement in 1964 to 1975 when 20,000 people lived in the caves with facilities such as offices, hospital, temples, markets, school, and entertainment centre.

Historical attractions here are 
 Kaysone Phomvihane's House where (in President Kaysone's garden) people narrate the history of how Viengxay became the center for liberation and suffered air attacks in the beginning
 Kaysone Phomvihane's Cave Office — the largest cave where gifts, a statue of Lenin, and collection of books can be seen
 Politburo Meeting Room: in the cave the leaders of the freedom movement deliberated on policies and important decisions
 Nouhak Phoumsavan's House (Pathet Lao's founding father)
 Nouhak Phoumsavan's Cave, Prince Souphanouvong's (who was known as "Red Prince") house and garden
 a stupa erected during the war to bury Souphanouvong's son, Ariya Thammasin to avoid detection during the war
 Prince Souphanouvong's Cave was used as a protection bunker during bombing by US forces known as "Ravens"
 Cave of Phoumi Vongvichid who established a schooling curriculum in the cave
 Cave of Sithone Kommadane, a valiant fighter during early years of war
 House of General Khamtay Siphandone, supreme military commander who motivated people to take to arms and Khamtay Siphandone's Cave where he established and operated the communication system with his forces
 Cave Barracks of ex soldiers
 Artillery Cave where heavy anti-aircraft batteries were operated
 Xanglot Cave where weddings and traditional festivals were held during the war

Wat Pho Xai or Wat Pho Xaysanalam is on the outskirts of Sam Neua. Hintang Archaeological Park, a UNESCO World Heritage Site, is one of the most important pre-historic sites in northern Laos, dotted with about 2,000-year-old menhirs (standing stones) or megaliths, which were unearthed in 1931. Locals refer to it as Sao Hin Tang, meaning "Standing Stone Pillars". It is also known as the Stonehenge of Laos, with many  stones. Apart from these finds, funerary burial sites with artifacts of ancient trinkets, standing rock slabs and stone disks were found. These archaeological finds are older than the Plain of Jars and are seen along a 12-km mountain ridge in the southern part of the province. Local animists believe that the stone discs at the site once sat atop the megaliths and fed Jahn Han, the sky spirit.  from Sam Neua is the Ban Tham Buddha Cave.

Nameuang Hot Springs is another landmark amidst the valley of paddy fields on the way to Xam Neua, where there is the Houaiyad waterfall. The springs are the source of a small river. In Houaiyad village, crashed aircraft parts and cans of war relics are recycled into belts.

Villages
 

Ban Kenpha

Gallery

Notes

References

Further reading
  A Dr. Siri Paiboun mystery set in Houaphanh province.

 
Provinces of Laos